Myoxomorpha vidua is a species of beetle in the family Cerambycidae. It was described by Lacordaire in 1872.

References

Acanthoderini
Beetles described in 1872